The National Hockey League's Metropolitan Division (often referred to simply as the "Metro Division") was formed in 2013 as one of the two divisions in the Eastern Conference as part of a league realignment. It is also a successor of the original Atlantic Division and one of the two successors to the Southeast Division. Six of its teams were previously together in the Patrick Division from 1981 to 1993 (one joined in 1982). It is the only NHL division without a Canadian team, with five of the division's clubs located in either the New York City area or in Pennsylvania and the other three in North Carolina, Ohio and Washington, D.C.

The Metropolitan Division contains some of the most historic and intense rivalries in the NHL, including Flyers–Penguins, Devils–Rangers, Capitals–Penguins, Islanders–Rangers, Capitals–Rangers, Flyers–Rangers, Capitals–Flyers, and Devils–Flyers. Three of its teams (Rangers, Islanders, Devils) are within the league's largest market (New York), the Flyers are in the fourth largest market (Philadelphia), and the Capitals are in the seventh largest (Washington, D.C.). Games involving Metropolitan Division teams are frequently shown on U.S. national television.

Division lineups

2013–2020
 Carolina Hurricanes
 Columbus Blue Jackets
 New Jersey Devils
 New York Islanders
 New York Rangers
 Philadelphia Flyers
 Pittsburgh Penguins
 Washington Capitals

Changes from the 2012–13 season
 The Metropolitan Division is formed due to NHL realignment
 The Northeast and Southeast Divisions are dissolved due to NHL realignment
 The New Jersey Devils, New York Islanders, New York Rangers, Philadelphia Flyers, and Pittsburgh Penguins come from the Atlantic Division
 The Carolina Hurricanes and Washington Capitals come from the Southeast Division
 The Columbus Blue Jackets come from the Central Division

2020–2021
 Division not used for the 2020–21 NHL season

Changes from the 2019–20 season
 Due to COVID-19 restrictions the NHL realigned into four divisions with no conferences for the 2020–21 season
 The Carolina Hurricanes and Columbus Blue Jackets move to the Central Division
 The New Jersey Devils, New York Islanders, New York Rangers, Philadelphia Flyers, Pittsburgh Penguins and Washington Capitals move to the East Division

2021–present
 Carolina Hurricanes
 Columbus Blue Jackets
 New Jersey Devils
 New York Islanders
 New York Rangers
 Philadelphia Flyers
 Pittsburgh Penguins
 Washington Capitals

Changes from the 2020–21 season
 The league returned to using a four division and two conference alignment
 The Carolina Hurricanes and Columbus Blue Jackets come from the Central Division
 The New Jersey Devils, New York Islanders, New York Rangers, Philadelphia Flyers, Pittsburgh Penguins and Washington Capitals come from the East Division

Division champions
 2014 – Pittsburgh Penguins (51–24–7, 109 pts)
 2015 – New York Rangers (53–22–7, 113 pts)
 2016 – Washington Capitals (56–18–8, 120 pts)
 2017 – Washington Capitals (55–19–8, 118 pts)
 2018 – Washington Capitals (49–26–7, 105 pts)
 2019 – Washington Capitals (48–26–8, 104 pts)
 2020 – Washington Capitals (41–20–8, 90 pts)
 2021 – Division suspended for season
 2022 – Carolina Hurricanes (54–20–8, 116 pts)

Season results

Notes
 The 2019–20 NHL season was cut short due to the COVID-19 pandemic. Due to the imbalance in the number of games played among teams, the regular season standings were determined by points percentage.

Stanley Cup winners produced
 2016 – Pittsburgh Penguins
 2017 – Pittsburgh Penguins
 2018 – Washington Capitals

Presidents' Trophy winners produced
 2015 – New York Rangers
 2016 – Washington Capitals
 2017 – Washington Capitals

Metropolitan Division titles won by team 
Teams in bold are currently in the division.

References

 NHL History

 
National Hockey League divisions
Sports in the Eastern United States
Carolina Hurricanes
Columbus Blue Jackets
New Jersey Devils
New York Islanders
New York Rangers
Philadelphia Flyers
Pittsburgh Penguins
Washington Capitals